Wan Osman Wan Awang, also known by his pen name Usman Awang (12 July 1929 – 29 November 2001) was a Malaysian poet, playwright, novelist and Malaysian National Laureate (1983).

Brief biography 
Wan Osman was born into a poor peasant family. He graduated from 6th grade of his local Malay school. During the Japanese occupation, he was kidnapped by Japanese soldiers to Singapore to do forced labour there. After the war, he joined the police force and served in Johore and Malacca between the years of 1946 to 1951. In 1951, he moved to Singapore, where he initially worked as a proofreader and then as a reporter for the newspaper Melayu Raya. He later joined the weekly Mingguan Melayu - in 1952, its daily counterpart Utusan Melayu began publishing his first poems and stories on both these newspapers. After Malaya's independence in 1957, he lived in Kuala Lumpur and worked in the national language regulatory board, the Dewan Bahasa dan Pustaka until 1985.

Usman Awang died of a heart attack on 29 November 2001 in Kuala Lumpur. He was laid to rest at Bukit Kiara Muslim Cemetery, Kuala Lumpur.
He was 72 years old.

Creativity 
In the early period he used the pseudonym "Tongkat Warrant" ("The Baton"). One of the founders of the movement "Asas-50" which advocated "Literature for society". The author of several collections of poetry, more than twenty plays, one novel (Tulang-Tulang Berserakan - "Scattered bones"), numerous short stories and journalistic articles. His works are translated into 11 languages of the world, including English.

Social activities 
He was the first Chairman of the literary organization "Pena" from 1961 to 1965. In 1964, he together with other compatriots created a protest movement against the infringing of the Malay language's status as the national language of Malaysia known as the Keranda 152 ("Coffin 152"). In 1986, he initiated the creation of the Council for Translation and Creative Works of Malaysia, now known as the Institut Terjemahan Buku Malaysia (the Malaysian Book Translation Institute). He headed the Friendship Society "Malaysia-China" from the time of its creation in 1992.

Awards 
 S.E.A. Write Award (1982)
 State Literary Prize (1983).
 Malaysian National Laureate (1983)
 Honorary Doctor of University of Malaya
 Darjah Kebesaran by the Sultan of Perak and the title "Dato’" (1991)

Criticisms 
Creativity of the poet is imbued with humanistic ideas. The prominent Malaysian critic Syed Husin Ali, one of his closest friends, wrote about him stating:  "Usman is popularly considered, and most justifiably too, as perhaps the best poet in the Malay language. Most important, he is accepted without question as a people’s poet. Writing since 1955, Usman did not produce a very large corpus of poetry, only about 200 of them. But the man, his personality, his poetry and his ideas have a much deeper and wider influence than that number would suggest. Much of his poems are simple, clear, often romantic, and just beautiful. He is a master at weaving words into striking phrases, sentences and verses that are of exceptional classical beauty and sometimes appear to be nostalgic and even escapist"  .

Soviet orientalist B.B.Parnickel assessed Usman's creativity, writing:  "With rich, euphonious, in a way traditional language, he wrote a lot and enthusiastically about his homeland, love, freedom, and the wave of his emotions affects  truly magically his readers"

Legacy
Several places and honours were named after him, including:
Sekolah Kebangsaan Dato Usman Awang, a primary school at Kampung Kota Kechil in Kota Tinggi, Johor.
Sekolah Menengah Kebangsaan Dato' Usman Awang, a secondary school which was formerly known as Sekolah Menengah Kebangsaan Taman Perling located at Taman Perling in Johor Bahru, Johor.
Jalan Dato' Usman Awang, a road in Sedili, Johor.
 In May 15, 2014 in Kuala Lumpur the Usman Awang Foundation was established which annually awards the National Integration Award named after Usman Awang.
 In April 2016, a stamp and envelope with the image of the writer were issued

Bibliography 
Pogadaev, Victor (5 December 2001), Bapa Sastera Melayu Moden (The Father of Modern Malay Literature). – Berita Harian, .
Pogadaev, Victor (16 March 2002), ‘Dari Bintang ke Bintang’ papar kekuatan puisi Usman ("From One Star To Another" Shows the High Level of Usman' Poetry). – Berita Harian
Zurinah Hassan, (2006) Sasterawan negara Usman Awang (National Laureate Usman Awang). Kuala Lumpur:Dewan Bahasa dan Pustaka. 
Muhammad Haji Salleh (2006), Seorang Penyair, Sebuah Benua Rusuh: Biografi Usman Awang (A Poet and Revolting Continent: Usman Awang' Biography). Kuala Lumpur: Dewan Bahasa dan Pustaka. , 
Usman Awang: Penghubung Sastera Moden Dengan Akar Tradisi (Usman Awang: A Linc Between Modern and Traditional Literature). 2003. Editor, Hamzah Hamdani. Johore Baru: Yayasan Warisan Johor, . , 
Halilah Haji Khalid (2004), Usman Awang Dalam Esei dan Kritikan (Usman Awang in Essays and Ctitics). Kuala Lumpur: Dewan Bahasa dan Pustaka, 2004.
 Chong Fah Hing (2010), Karya Usman Awang dari Persepsi Masyarakat Cina (Works of Usman Avang in the perception of the Chinese community). - Dlm. Menyirat Inspirasi. Penyelenggara Dato 'Dr. Ahmad Khamal Abdullah, Johor Bahru: YWJ Citra Holdings Sdn. Bhd.pp. 109–113.

References

External links 
Keeping dad’s legacy alive (The Sun Daily)

1929 births
2001 deaths
People from Johor
Malaysian people of Malay descent
Malaysian writers
Malaysian poets
S.E.A. Write Award winners
Malay-language poets
Malaysian National Laureates